The Royal Birmingham Conservatoire is a music school, drama school and concert venue in Birmingham, England. It provides education in music, acting, and related disciplines up to postgraduate level. It is a centre for scholarly research and doctorate-level study in areas such as performance practice, composition, musicology and music history. It is the only one of the nine conservatoires in the United Kingdom that is also part of a faculty of a university, in this case Arts, Design and Media at Birmingham City University. It is a member of the Federation of Drama Schools, and a founder member of Conservatoires UK.

The conservatoire houses a 500-seat concert hall and other performance spaces including a recital hall, organ studio, and a dedicated jazz club. It was founded in 1886 as the Birmingham School of Music, the first music school to be established in England outside London.

History 
The Royal Birmingham Conservatoire was founded in 1886 as the Birmingham School of Music, grouping together into a single entity the various musical education activities of the Birmingham and Midland Institute. The institute had conducted informal musical instruction from its foundation in 1854, and its predecessor organisation, the Birmingham Philosophical Institution, had held music classes since 1800; but it was in 1859 that music was established as a formal part of the institute's curriculum. Singing classes began in that year and, after some initial struggles, 110 students and were performing regular concerts by 1863. In 1876, a proposal was heard at the institute's council that further classes should be established on the model of the Leipzig Conservatoire, and that year the composer Alfred Gaul began teaching classes in the theory of music. In 1882 instrumental classes were started, attracting 458 students on their first year, and a separate music section created within the institute. This was established as the separate "School of Music" in 1886, with William Stockley as its first principal  The school's second principal Granville Bantock was recommended for the position by Edward Elgar

The name 'Birmingham Conservatoire' was adopted in 1989, with its undergraduate diploma and award (GBSM and ABSM) renamed from 'Graduate/Associate of the Birmingham School of Music' to 'Graduate/Associate of the Birmingham Schools of Music', to reflect the internal structure adopted of the Schools of Creative Studies, of Orchestral Studies, of Keyboard Studies, and of Vocal Studies. In 1995, the GBSM degree-equivalent diploma was redesigned to become a full Bachelor of Music (BMus) degree. In 2008, as part of the university's reorganisation of faculties, it became a part of the Faculty of Performance, Media and English (PME), which has since merged to become the Faculty of Arts, Design and Media.

As part of the Paradise Circus redevelopment the former site of the Conservatoire was subject to a compulsory purchase by Birmingham City Council. The Conservatoire received £29 million in compensation in a deal agreed in December 2013; this deal included £12.4 million of council expenditure. Designed by Feilden Clegg Bradley Studios the new building on Jennens Road contains teaching and performance space including a 500-seat concert hall to replace Adrian Boult Hall. Building work started in August 2015 and was completed in August 2017. Adrian Boult Hall was demolished in June 2016. The remaining building on Paradise Circus was demolished by April 2018 as part of Phase I of the scheme. In July 2015, Galliford Try were confirmed as principal contractor on a £46 million contract.

In 2017 the conservatoire merged with the Birmingham School of Acting, which had been founded as a drama school in 1936, bringing music and drama teaching together into a single organisation. Alumni of the school include Nicol Williamson, Tom Lister, Catherine Tyldesley, Rachel Bright, Barbara Keogh, Luke Mably, James Bradshaw, Stephen Laughton, Jeffrey Holland, David Holt, Anna Brewster, Jimi Mistry, Helen George, Ainsley Howard Nicholas Gledhill and Amanda Leigh Owen, John Arthur, Tony Bowers, Jeffrey Chiswick, James Duggan, Anthony Higgins, Annie Hayes, Paul Henry, Karl Johnson, Mike Kinsey, Lloyd McGuire, Jeremy Nicholas, Larry Rew, John Rowe, Michael Strobel, Lynne Verrall, and Brian Weston.

On 24 September 2017 the conservatoire was granted Royal status by Queen Elizabeth II.

The conservatoire

In 2003, there were around 600 students enrolled in the Conservatoire's undergraduate and postgraduate degrees. Subjects include solo performance, composition, chamber music, orchestral playing, music technology and jazz. Students on the four-year BMus(Hons) are encouraged to spend time studying in Europe or the USA.

In their Junior Department, training for children aged 8 to 18 years takes place weekly on Saturdays during the local school term.

The museum has a notable collection of musical instruments.

Departments
Brass
Chamber Music
Composition
Conducting (Choral)
Conducting (Orchestral)
Early music
Jazz
Keyboard
Music Technology
Percussion
Performing Ensembles
Strings
Vocal & Operatic
Woodwind

Performances

Conservatoire students perform regularly in the conservatoire's concert venues, and also nationally often at Symphony Hall Birmingham and Birmingham Town Hall and internationally under such conductors as Sir Simon Rattle, Pierre Boulez, Sakari Oramo, Mirga Grazinyte-Tyla, Paul Spicer and Jeffrey Skidmore.

The conservatoire collaborates with other schools of music, colleges, academies and conservatoires worldwide, including participating in the Erasmus student and staff exchange programme.

Courses offered
Royal Birmingham Conservatoire offers training from pre-college level (Junior Conservatoire) to PhD.
 Bachelor of Music honours degrees
 BMus (Hons) Performance
 BMus (Hons) Jazz
 BMus (Hons) Composition
 BMus (Hons) Music Technology
 Bachelor of Science honours degree
 BSc (Hons) Music Technology
 Graduate Diploma in Jazz
 Postgraduate Certificate
 PgCert
 Postgraduate Diploma
 PgDip (Music)
 PgDip (Musical Theatre) — to be delivered jointly with Birmingham School of Acting
 Advanced Postgraduate Diploma
 Advanced PgDip
 Master of Music
 MMus
 Master of Philosophy
 MPhil
 Doctor of Philosophy
 PhD

People

Principals
 William Stockley (1886–1900)
 Granville Bantock (1900–1934)
 Allen Blackhall (1934–1945)
 Christopher Edmunds (1945–1956)
 (Management Committee) (1956–1957)
 Sir Steuart Wilson (1957–1960)
 Gordon Clinton (1960–1973)
 John Bishop (1973–1975)
 Louis Carus (1975–1987)
 Roy Wales (1987–1989)
 Kevin Thompson (1989–1993)
 George Caird (1993-2010)
 David Saint (2010-2015)
 Julian Lloyd Webber (2015–2020)

Staff
Royal Birmingham Conservatoire has around 80 full-time members of staff that include active professional musicians, performers, composers, conductors and scholars. In addition, nearly 250 hspecialist tutors, musicians and scholars visit the conservatoire to give classes and guest lectures or to serve as visiting faculty members.

Notable current and former staff and visiting guest artists include:

 Meyrick Alexander - bassoonist
 Stephen Barlow - conductor
 Ed Bennett - composer; leader/conductor, decibel
 Mark Bebbington - pianist
 Nicola Benedetti - violinist
 Christian Blackshaw - pianist
 Arno Bornkamp - saxophonist
 Margaret Cookhorn - contrabassoonist
 Philip Cobb - trumpeter
 Rutland Boughton - composer
 Pierre Boulez - composer
 George Caird - oboist
 Jiafeng Chen - violinist
 Jiaxin Cheng - cellist
 Gary Cooper – conductor, harpsichordist
 Joe Cutler - composer
 Nicholas Daniel - oboist
 Danielle de Niese - soprano
 Andrew Downes - composer
 Tony Dudley-Evans
 Henry Fairs - organist
 Catrin Finch - harpist
 Margaret Fingerhut - pianist
 Byron Fulcher - trombonist
 James Galway - flautist
 James Gilchrist - tenor
 Rivka Golani - violist
 Mirga Grazinyte-Tyla - conductor
 Simon Halsey - conductor
 Stephen Hough - pianist
 Leonidas Kavakos - violinist
 Sheku Kanneh-Mason - cellist
 Miloš Karadaglić - guitarist
 Jonathan Kelly - oboe
 Hans Koller - pianist; composer; bandleader
 Stephen Kovacevich
 Justin Lavender - vocal
 Robert Levin - harpsichord/fortepiano
 Tasmin Little - violinist
 Julian Lloyd Webber - cellist
 Louis Lortie - pianist
 Rupert Marshall-Luck - violinist
 Philip Martin - pianist
 Denis Matthews - pianist
 Melinda Maxwell - oboist
 John Mayer - composer
 Amos Miller - trombonist
 Daniel Moult - organist
 Tai Murray- violinist
 Pascal Nemirovski - pianist
 Liam Noble - pianist; composer; bandleader
 Craig Ogden - guitarist
 Edwin Roxburgh - composer; conductor; oboist
 Howard Skempton - composer; accordionist
 Jeffrey Skidmore - conductor, Ex Cathedra
 Dmitry Sitkovetsky - violinist; conductor
 Paul Spicer - conductor
 Mike Stevens (saxophonist) - musical director
 Simon de Souza - horn
 Errollyn Wallen - composer
 Michael Wolters - composer
 Jian Wang (cellist) - cellist
 Mary Wiegold's Songbook - vocalist
 Sarah Willis - horn
 Barry Wordsworth - conductor
 Di Xiao - pianist
 Ivan Yanakov (pianist) - pianist
 Xuefei Yang - guitarist
 Lauren Zhang - pianist

Fellows
 Gildas Quartet - Junior Fellows

Alumni

Ben Lee - jazz mandolin player
 Richard van Allan - opera singer
 Nicola Coughlan - actress
 Fred Thelonius Baker - guitarist, bassist
 Dave Cliff - jazz guitarist
 Krzysztof Czerwiński - organist; conductor
 Henry Fairs - organist
 Brian Ferneyhough - composer 
 Mark Gasser - pianist
 Duncan Honeybourne - pianist
 Albert Ketèlbey - composer, conductor
 Jim Moray - singer, producer
 Laura Mvula - singer
 Michael Rayner - opera singer
 Jean Rigby - opera singer
 Rhydian Roberts - singer
 Michael Seal - violinist, conductor, CBSO
 Mike Stevens - musical director, producer
 Ian Venables - composer
 Segun Akinola - composer

Venues

 The Bradshaw Hall, formerly known as The Concert Hall, 500 seats
 Recital Hall, 150 seats
 Organ Studio, 100 seats
 Eastside Jazz Club, 80 seats
 Experimental Music Lab

See also
 Education in Birmingham

References

Bibliography

Morley, Christopher. Royal Birmingham Conservatoire, 2017, Elliott & Thompson

External links
 
 
 The history of Birmingham Conservatoire
 History & Origins Of Birmingham City University

Education in Birmingham, West Midlands
Music schools in England
Conservatoire
Buildings and structures in Birmingham, West Midlands
Culture in Birmingham, West Midlands
Musical instrument museums
Educational institutions established in 1886
1886 establishments in England
Royal colleges